GNE may refer to:
 Equatorial Guinea, ITU country code
 GNE (encyclopedia), a free content encyclopedia
 GNE (gene)
 Ganang language, spoken in Nigeria
 Genesis Energy Limited, a New Zealand energy company
 Go North East, an English bus operator
 UDP-N-acetylglucosamine 2-epimerase (hydrolysing)
 Guru Nanak Dev Engineering College, Ludhiana (GNE Ludhiana), Punjab, India